Jagacha High School is a school in Jagacha Town, Howrah, West Bengal, India. It was founded on 2 January 1949. The affairs of the school are controlled by a board of governors. Mr. Bhabatosh Ghosh is chairman of the board.

Buildings
The school is situated in front of Jagacha Police Station. The school has two two-storey buildings and three three-storey buildings. All the buildings are Saffron color. One new Computer Sciences Block has been made by the school committee. 12 December 2015 a Vivekanda Statue was established there.

Subjects
The subjects taught in the school are Bengali, English, Sanskrit, History, Geography, Mathematics, Physics, Chemistry, Biology, Art, Principles of Accounts, Structure of Commerce, Office Practice, Economics, Computer Application, Computer Science and Socially Useful Productive Work and Community Service.

After the Madhyamik Examination, there is a division in study stream. The choices being Arts, Commerce and Science.

References
 wbchse.nic.in/WEBSITE%202ndPage/_notes/Horwah.pdf 
 www.schoolplex.in/schools/Kolkata-jagacha-high-school-6219.aspx 

High schools and secondary schools in West Bengal
Schools in Howrah district
Education in Howrah
Educational institutions established in 1949
1949 establishments in West Bengal